Bernice D. Mireku-North (born 1981/1982) is an American politician. She is currently a Democratic member of the Maryland House of Delegates, appointed by Governor Larry Hogan to fill the term of Eric Luedtke, who resigned on January 2, 2023, to serve as the chief legislative officer of governor-elect Wes Moore. She was previously a candidate for Montgomery County State's Attorney in 2022.

Background
Mireku-North attended Montgomery County public schools and graduated from the University of Maryland, College Park and the Howard University School of Law. She also previously served as a judicial law clerk to D.C. Superior Court Associate Judge Hiram E. Puig-Lugo and Prince George's Circuit Court Judge Dwight D. Jackson.

Mireku-North served as the assistant state's attorney in Anne Arundel County from 2009 to 2015 before joining the Law Office of Aileen Oliver. She is currently the owner of the North Law Group and a criminal defense attorney.

In 2020, Mireku-North was named co-chair of the Reimagining Public Safety Task Force organized by Montgomery County executive Marc Elrich. The 41-member task force released its final report on February 5, 2021, which included 87 recommendations including redirecting select 9-1-1 calls to non-law enforcement agencies, eliminating police training programs with connections to military training, and increasing recruitment at historically Black colleges and universities.

In June 2021, Mireku-North filed to run for Montgomery County State's Attorney, challenging incumbent state's attorney John McCarthy. She ran on a platform of criminal justice reform, increasing diversity in the state's attorney's office, and diverting minor offenders from jail. Mireku-North was defeated by McCarthy in the Democratic primary on July 19, 2022.

In October 2022, Mireku-North applied to fill a vacancy in the Montgomery County Planning Commission.

In the legislature
In December 2022, Mireku-North filed to fill the vacancy left by the resignation of then-Majority Leader of the Maryland House of Delegates Eric Luedtke, seeking to serve out his four-year term in the Maryland House of Delegates. On January 3, 2023, the Montgomery County Democratic Central Committee voted to nominate Mireku-North to fill the vacancy, and on January 6, Governor Larry Hogan appointed her to fill the seat.

Committee assignments 
 Ways and Means Committee, 2023–present (early childhood subcommittee, 2023–present; local revenues subcommittee, 2023–present)

Other memberships 
 Legislative Black Caucus of Maryland, 2023–present
 Women Legislators of Maryland, 2023–present

Electoral history

References

External links
 
 

1980s births
21st-century African-American women
21st-century African-American politicians
21st-century American politicians
21st-century American women politicians
African-American state legislators in Maryland
African-American women in politics
Democratic Party members of the Maryland House of Delegates
Living people
Maryland lawyers
Women state legislators in Maryland